The Dream Factory is a 1997 Chinese comedy film directed by Feng Xiaogang.  It was one of the first notable and successful he sui pian movies (Chinese New Year films) made in mainland China. It was written by Feng Xiaogang and Wang Gang, adapting a Wang Shuo novel.

Plot
Four friends in Beijing—three men and a woman—start a company which specializes in fulfilling their clients' dreams. Enacting their wildest fantasies, they encounter many oddball clients along the way.

References

External links

1997 films
Chinese comedy films
Films directed by Feng Xiaogang
1997 comedy films
Films based on Chinese novels
Films set in Beijing
Chinese New Year films